The seventh season of the One Piece anime series are produced by Toei Animation and directed by Kōnosuke Uda adapted from Eiichiro Oda's manga of the same name. The season was released in Japan as a single chapter, called "Escape! The Naval Fortress & The Foxy Pirate Crew". It deals with the Straw Hat Pirates' infiltration of and escape from a Marine fortress to reclaim their confiscated treasure. The Straw Hats later meet Foxy the Silver Fox and his crew, who challenges them to the Davy Back Fight, a competition involving battles between Foxy's crew and Luffy's crew. Soon after, they encounter Admiral Aokiji, a Marine admiral who is determined to capture Nico Robin, but spares the crew after defeating Luffy.

The season began broadcasting on Fuji Television on June 20, 2004 and ended March 27, 2005, lasting 33 episodes. One Piece began airing in high definition, 16:9 format from the 207th episode.  Despite this, the Japanese DVD release remained in 4:3 fullscreen format until the beginning of the 8th season.

Funimation released the first ten episodes of the season in English as the conclusion their own US "Season Three" on April 19, 2011. In October, they announced that they had acquired the remaining episodes, along with the entirety of the following season for release as part of "Season Four".  Funimation released each of the Season's episodes in their original aspect ratio. Beginning with this season, One Piece also made its return to Toonami, now a Saturday night block on Adult Swim, in its uncut form. Continuing from episode 207, the season debuted on May 19, 2013. The previous season had aired on Toonami in 2008, during the weekend block's original run on Cartoon Network.

The episodes use four pieces of theme music throughout the series. The first opening theme, titled "Bon Voyage" by Bon-Bon Blanco in Japanese and Brina Palencia in English, and the ending theme, titled "Dreamship" and performed by Aiko Ikuta in Japanese and Jessi James in English continues to be used for the beginning of the season. In English speaking territories, "Mirai Koukai" was replaced with "Eternal Pose" (the following ending theme) due to music licensing issues.


Episode list

Home releases

Japanese

English
In North America, this season was recategorized as part of "Season Three" and "Four" for its DVD release by Funimation Entertainment. The Australian Season sets were renamed Collection 16 through 18.

Notes

References
General

Specific

2004 Japanese television seasons
2005 Japanese television seasons
One Piece seasons
One Piece episodes